Modzele may refer to the following places:
Modzele, Masovian Voivodeship (east-central Poland)
Modzele, Gmina Grajewo in Podlaskie Voivodeship (north-east Poland)
Modzele, Gmina Wąsosz in Podlaskie Voivodeship (north-east Poland)